The Pan American Archery Championships is an outdoor archery sports championships gathering nations from North America, Central America, South America and the Caribbean.

Championships

Outdoor

References 

 
International archery competitions
International sports championships in the Americas
Recurring sporting events established in 1972